Jahelu (also Romanized as Jāhelū; also known as Jahlū, Johlū, and Joholū) is a village in Piveshk Rural District, Lirdaf District, Jask County, Hormozgan Province, Iran. At the 2006 census, its population was 222, in 63 families.

References 

Populated places in Jask County